The Men's 56 kg weightlifting competitions at the 2016 Summer Olympics in Rio de Janeiro took place on 7 August at the Pavilion 2 of Riocentro.

The medals were presented by Chang Ung, IOC member, North Korea and Salvatore Coffa, Vice President of International Weightlifting Federation.

Schedule
All times are Time in Brazil (UTC-03:00)

Records
Prior to this competition, the existing world and Olympic records were as follows.

Results

New records

References

Weightlifting at the 2016 Summer Olympics
Men's events at the 2016 Summer Olympics